Kuppuswamy Nagarajan (born 15 September 1930 Sirupalai Village, Tamil Nadu) is an Indian organic chemist.

He earned a Ph.D. with Prof. T. R. Govindachari, Presidency College, Madras. 

He won the Shanti Swarup Bhatnagar Prize for Chemical Sciences, 1974;

Selected papers
Kuppuswamy Nagarajan, Vunnam R. Rao, Rashmi K. Shah, Sharada J. Shenoy, Hans Fritz, Wilhelm J. Richter, Dieter Muller, "Condensed Heterotricycles. Synthesis and Reactions of b-Fused 1(2H)-Isoquinolinones with unusual enaminic properties", Helvetica Chimica Acta, Volume 71, Issue 1, pages 77–92, 3 February 1988
Kuppuswamy Nagarajan, Patrick J. Rodriguesa and Munirathinam Nethajib, "Vilsmeier-Haack reaction of 1-methyl-34-dihydroisoquino lines-unexpected formation of 2,3-bisdimethylamino-5,6-dihydropyrrolo (2,1- ) isoquinolines", Tetrahedron Letters, Volume 33, Issue 47, 17 November 1992, Pages 7229-7232
Kuppuswamy Nagarajan, Joy David, Agasaladinni N. Goud, 10-Alkyl- and 10-aminoalkyl-2,2'-bis(trifluoromethyl)-3,10'-biphenothiazines, J. Med. Chem., 1974, 17 (6), pp 652–653, June 1974

References

External links
google scholar

Living people
Fellows of the Indian National Science Academy
1930 births
Fellows of the Indian Academy of Sciences
Recipients of the Shanti Swarup Bhatnagar Award in Chemical Science
Scientists from Tamil Nadu
Indian organic chemists
Presidency College, Chennai alumni
Wayne State University alumni
Indian scientific authors